The Archdiocese of the British Isles and Ireland is a diocese of the Antiochian Orthodox Church in England.

History 
Before 1995, only one Antiochian Orthodox community was around in England. On the 17th of October 2013, the Holy Synod of the Church of Antioch established the Archdiocese of the British Isles and Ireland.

On the 24th of June 2015, after a period of deliberation, Archimandrite Silouan Oner was elected by the Holy Synod of the Church of Antioch to serve as the first Metropolitan of the Archdiocese. On the 30th of August 2015, Oner received his episcopal consecration at the Monastery of St. George, Al-Humraiyah in Syria. Oner was enthroned on the 27th of February 2016.

See also 

 List of Greek Orthodox Antiochian Churches in Europe
 Greek Orthodox Patriarchate of Antioch

References 

Greek Orthodox Church of Antioch
Eastern Orthodox dioceses in the United Kingdom
Eastern Orthodox dioceses in Ireland